is a former Japanese football player.

Playing career
Naito was born in Fujieda on May 25, 1978. After graduating from Shizuoka Gakuen High School, he joined J1 League club Shimizu S-Pulse based in his local in 1997. On March 26, he debuted as substitute midfielder at the 73rd minutes against JEF United Ichihara in J.League Cup. However after the debuted he could not play at all in the match and retired end of 1999 season.

Club statistics

References

External links

geocities.co.jp

1978 births
Living people
Association football people from Shizuoka Prefecture
Japanese footballers
J1 League players
Shimizu S-Pulse players
Association football midfielders
People from Fujieda, Shizuoka